Jahanabad Cantonment is the Bangladeshi military cantonment in Khulna, Bangladesh.

Education
 Cantonment Public College, Jahanabad, Khulna.
 Army Service Corps Centre and School (ASC&S)
 RVFC Records office 
 Branch Recruiting Unit, Khulna
Military Collegiate School Khulna (MCSK)

References

Cantonments of Bangladesh
Organisations based in Khulna